Tehandesar is a small populated place in the province of Rajasthan, India. Most of the population are of Hindu religion and speak Rajasthani.

References

Villages in Bikaner district